Dennis Huntley, born in Weybridge in Surrey, England, is a British sculptor, furniture designer and author. A  Fellow of the Royal British Society of Sculptors, he has completed works for cathedrals, individual collectors and other organisations. Among his most notable works are his sculptures for Guildford Cathedral.

Studies and career
Huntley studied at Wimbledon School of Art before attending London University.

Besides Huntley's work for Guildford Cathedral, his work, The Scholar, at the former Henry Thornton School in Clapham, London is also notable. His furniture was featured in an exhibition by the Crafts Council.

For several years, he was the Head of the Sir John Cass School of Art in Whitechapel. In 1970 he became a Fellow of the Royal British Society of Sculptors. He has broadcast on sculpture for BBC One and Thames Television and authored the book Modelling and Sculpture in 1976, which has been published by Hamlyn in London, New York, Sydney and Toronto.

In 1967, Huntley's statue of Anne Boleyn was awarded the Sir Otto Beit Medal for the best sculpture outside London anywhere in Britain or the Commonwealth.

At present, Huntley lectures on Comparative Anatomy, Perspective, Aesthetics and Painting and Drawing in all media.

Works
Huntley's work ranges from figurative to abstract and includes lettering and furniture design. Materials worked include stone, marble, slate, terracotta, iron, lead, zinc, bronze, wood and fibreglass.

His works include:
Clipsham stone figures for Guildford Cathedral:  St Cecilia, Lady Margaret Beaufort, St Hubert, and Piety, as well as two limewood angels for the Children's chapel.
Six figurative bath stone corbels at St. Mark's Church, Wimbledon: "Angel with Syrinx"; "Christ Turning Out Money Changers"; "Peter and the Tribute Money"; Saint Matthew; Saint John; and Saint Luke.
Semi-abstract metal figure commissioned by the LCC Patronage of the Arts Scheme for the Henry Thornton Comprehensive School, Clapham London.
Bronze portrait of Sir Seewoosagur Ramgoolam, Mauritian Prime Minister (won in competition).

See also 
 Guildford Cathedral
 The exterior of Guildford Cathedral

References

1928 births
Living people
British architectural sculptors
British sculptors
British male sculptors